This is a list of vehicles badged as Renault. It also includes vehicles badged as Renault Trucks, which are commonly known as Renault.

Current models

Historic models

Pre–World War I To World War I (1899–1918)
Voiturette (Type A/Type B/Type C/Type D/Type E/Type G/Type H/Type J) (1899–1903)
8CV (Type L/Type M/Type Z/Type AJ/Type AL/Type AN/Type AX) (1902–1914)
7CV (Type R/Type T) (1903–1904)
14CV (Type N (a)/Type N (b)/Type U (b)/Type U (c)/Type U (d)/Type X/Type AB/Type BX/Type CC/Type DJ) (1903–1914)
10CV (Type N (c)/Type Q/Type U (a)/Type U (e)/Type Y/Type AH/Type AM/Type BK/Type GS/Type IC/Type IG/Type II/Type IM/Type JR) (1903–1923) (Was facelifted as the Renault KZ in 1923)
20CV (Type S/Type V/Type AS/Type BY/Type BM/Type CE/Type CH/Type DX/Type EI/Type EJ) (1903–1919)
18CV (Type BF/Type CD/Type ED/Type FE/Type FS/Type GR/Type GV/Type HG/Type IQ/Type JS/Type JY/Type KD/Type MG/Type PI/Type PZ) (1909–1928)
22CV (Type DO/Type DP/Type EE) (1913–1914)
Taxi de la Marne (Type AG/Type AG–1) (1905–1921)
9CV (Type EK/Type FD) (1913–1920)
35CV (Type AI/Type AO/Type CF/Type CI/Type DQ/Type ET) (1906–1917)
40CV (Type AR/Type BH/Type CG/Type DT/Type ES/Type HD/Type IR/Type JP/Type IR1/Type IR2/Type JD/Type JV/Type JV1/Type MC/Type MC1/Type NM) (1908–1928)
12CV (Type AZ/Type BZ/Type CB/Type DG/Type EF/Type EU/Type JM/Type JT/Type KH/Type LS/Type ME) (1909–1926)
11CV (Type CQ/Type DM/Type ER/Type FK) (1912–1919)
EG (1914–1919)

Between the wars (1919–1939)
6CV (Type KJ/Type MT/Type NN) (1922–1930)
KZ (1923–1932)
Primaquatre (1931–1941)
AGx (1937–1941)
Vivaquatre (1932–1939)
15CV (Type KR/Type NE/Type NO/Type NS/Type PG/Type PK/Type PL/Type PM/Type RA) (1924–1928)
Vivasix (1927–1934)
Vivastella (1929–1939)
Primastella (1932–1934)
Monasix (1927–1931)
Monastella (1928–1932)
Reinastella (1929–1933)
Reinasport (1932–1934)
Nervastella (1929–1936)
Nervahuit (1930–1931)
Nervasport (1932–1935)
Nerva Grand Sport (1935–1938)
Suprastella (1938–1939)
Monaquatre (1932–1936)
Vivasport (1933–1935)
Viva Grand Sport (1935–1939)
ABx (1934–1937)
Celtaquatre (1934–1938)
Celtastandard (1935–1937)
ACx/ADx (1935–1940)
Juvaquatre (1937–1957) (Was facelifted as the Renault Dauphinoise in 1957)
Novaquatre (1938–1940)

World War II (1939–1945)
AHx (1941–1947)

After World War II to 1970 (1945–1970)

208D (1945–1948)
R.4080 (1948–1950)
4CV (1947–1961)
Galion (1947–1965)
Super Galion (1965–1982)
Voltigeur (1947–1965)
Goélette (1949–1965)
Super Goélette (1965–1982)
Colorale, including Prairie and Savane versions (1950–1956)
Fainéant (1950–1967)
Frégate (1951–1960)
MTP (1956–1959)
JL (1956–1964)
Dauphine (1956–1967)
Ondine (1961–1962)
Dauphinoise (1957–1960)
Floride (1959–1962)
Caravelle (1959–1968)
Estafette (1959–1980)
Rambler (1962–1967)
S (1964–1967)
SM (1967–1977)
SM8 (1967–1989)

Numeric models (1961–1996)
3 (1961–1962)
4 (1961–1992)
4 Fourgonette (1961–1988)
8 (1962–1973)
10 (1965–1971)
16 (1965–1980)
6 (1968–1980)
12 (1969–1980)
15 (1971–1979)
17 (1971–1979)
5 (1972–1996)
7 (Spain only) (1974–1984)
30 (1975–1983)
20 (1975–1984)
14 (1976–1983)
18 (1978–1986)
9 (1981–1989)
11 (1983–1989)
25 (1984–1992)
21 (1986–1995)
19 (1988–1996)

Former vehicles in production
Rodeo (1970–1986)
J (1975–1980)
Midliner (1980–1999)
Torino (Latin America only) (1975–1981)
H (1977–1980)
Virage (Australia only) (1978–1980)
Bandama (Africa only) (1978–1981)
100 Series (1979–1989)
50 Series (1979–1993)
Farma (Greece only) (1980–1985)
Fuego (1980–1986)
G (1980–1992)
R (1980–1996)
Alliance (North America only) (1982–1987)
Encore (North America only) (1984–1987)
B (1982–1999)
Espace (1984–2022) (to be revived as a 7-seater version of the Renault Austral in the summer of 2023)
Grand Espace (1998–2015)
Express (1985–2000)
Premier (North America only) (1986–1987)
CBH (1986–1997)
Medallion (North America only) (1987–1988)
Magnum (1990–2013)
Safrane (1992–2002)
Laguna (1994–2015)
Spider (1995–1999)
Puncher (1995–2009)
Premium (1996–2014)
Scenic (1996–2022) (To be revived as a Crossover SUV in 2024)
Scenic RX4 (2000–2003)
Grand Scenic (2004–2022)
Scenic Conquest (2007–2009)
Kerax (1997–2014)
Mascott (1999–2010)
Midlum (1999–2013)
Symbol (Africa, Central Europe, Eastern Europe, Latin America, Middle East, Russia, and Turkey only) (1999–2021)
Logan (Africa, Central Europe, Eastern Europe, Latin America, Middle East, Russia, and Turkey only) (2004–2021)
PK (Iran only) (2000–2007)
Avantime (2001–2003)
Vel Satis (2001–2009)
Modus (2004–2012)
Grand Modus (2008–2012)
Maxity (2007–2019)
Fluence (2009–2016)
Scala (Mexico) (2010–2013)
Scala (India) (2012–2017)
Access (2010–2013)
Wind (2010–2013)
Latitude (2010–2015)
Pulse (India only) (2012–2017)
Talisman (China) (2012–2020)
Talisman (Europe) (2015–2022)
Kadjar (2015-2022)

Concept cars

5 EV (2021)
Alaskan (2015)
Altica (2006)
Argos (1994)
Arkana (2018)
Avantime (1999)
Be Bop (2003)
Captur (2011)
Coupe Corbusier (2015)
DCross (2012)
DeZir (2010)
Egeus (2005)
Ellypse (2002)
Eolab (2014)
Espider (1998)
Étoile Filante (1954)
Evado (1995)
Eve (1981)
EZ-GO (2018)
EZ-PRO (2018)
EZ-ULTIMO (2018)
Fiftie (1996)
Fluence (2004)
Frendzy (2011)
Gabbiano (1983)
Initiale (1995)
Initiale Paris (2013)
K-ZE (2018)
Koleos (2000)
Koleos (2006)
Kwid (2014)
Laguna (1990)
Long Cours (1994)
Ludo (1994)
Mégane (1988)
Modus (1994)
Modus (2004)
Morphoz (2020)   
Nepta (2006)
Next (1995)
Ondelios (2008)
Operandi (2000)
Pangea (1997)
R8 Coupe (1964)
Racoon (1993)
Reinastella (1992)
R-Space (2011)
Scenic (1991)
Scénic (2007)
Symbioz (2017)
Talisman (2001)
Trezor (2016)
Twin'Run (2013)
Twin’Z (2013) 
Wind (2004)
Vel Satis (1998)
Vesta (1983)
Vesta 2 (1987)
Z.E. (2008–2010)
Zo (1998)
Zoe (2005)
Zoom (1992)

Others

Buses
Type PR (1926–1930)
PN (1926–1930)
TN (1931–1971)
215D (1946–1949)
R4200 (1949–1957)
ZR20 (1958–1960)
SC1 (1960–1964)
UI20 (1958–1959)
S45 (1964–1993)
SC10 (1965–1989), initially launched by Saviem
E7 (1969–1983)
SG220 (1978–1983)
PR14 (1979–1989)
PR100 (1980–1999)
FR1 (1983–1996)
Iliade (1996–2002)
R312 (1987–1997)
Tracer (1991–2002)
Agora (1995–2002)
Récréo (1996–2001)
Ares (1998–2002)

Tanks
FT (1917–1949)
D1 (1932–1943)
D2 (1936–1940)
UE Chenillette (1932–1941)
AMR 33 (1933–1935)
AMR 35 (1936–1939)
AMC 34 (1935–1940)
AMC 35 (1938–1940)
R35 (1936–1940)
R40 (1940)
B1 (1936–1945)

References

External links
Old Renault prototypes and concept cars

 
Renault